Birinci Səmədxanlı (also, Samedkhanly Pervyye and Samit-Khan) is a village and municipality in the Masally Rayon of Azerbaijan.  It has a population of 885.

References 

Populated places in Masally District